Sitātapatra (Sanskrit: "White Parasol") is a protector against supernatural danger in Buddhism. She is venerated in both the Mahayana and Vajrayana traditions. She is also known as Usnisasitatapatra or Uṣṇīṣa Sitātapatra. It is believed that Sitātapatra is a powerful independent deity emanated by Gautama Buddha from his Uṣṇīṣa. Whoever practices her mantra will be reborn in Amitābha's pure land of Sukhāvatī as well as gaining protection against supernatural danger and witchcraft.

Name

Her name is composed of sita ("white") and ātapatrā ("parasol" or "umbrella").

Forms
There are several different forms of Sitatapatra including: 
with one face and two arms; with three faces and six arms; with three faces and eight arms; with three faces and ten arms; with five faces and ten arms; and, with 1000 faces, 1000 arms and 1000 legs.

Mantras
ཧཱུཾ་མ་མ་ཧཱུཾ་ནི་སྭཱཧཱ།
Hum ma ma hum ni svaha

The Śūraṅgama Mantra of the Śūraṅgama Sūtra is the most commonly practiced mantra invoking her. According to Thubten Zopa Rinpoche, the "Great White Umbrella" is a sādhanā for healing illness, dispelling interferences and spirit possession, quelling disasters, and bringing auspiciousness. To do practice in full requires a kriyātantra abhiṣeka of Sitātapatrā for the vajrayana practitioners. The Sutra "ārya-tathāgatoṣṇīṣa-sitātapatrāparājita-mahāpratyaṅgirāparama-siddhā-nāma-dhāraṇī": "The Noble Dhāraṇī of Sitātapatrā Born from the Tathāgata’s Uṣṇīṣa, Great Dispeller of Invincible Might and Supreme Accomplishment" can be practiced and read by everybody.

Symbolism

Sitātapatrā is one of the most complex Vajrayana goddesses. According to Miranda Shaw in the Buddhist Goddesses of India, Sitātapatrā emerged from Buddha's uṣṇīṣa when he was in the Trāyastriṃśa heaven. The Buddha announced her role to "cut asunder completely all malignant demons, to cut asunder all the spells of others...to turn aside all enemies and dangers and hatred." Sitātapatrā's benign and beautiful form belies her ferocity as she is a "fierce, terrifying goddess, garlanded by flames, a pulverizer of enemies and demons."

In the Mahayana Sitatapatra Sutra, she is called Aparājita "Undefeatable, Unconquerable" and is also identified as a form of goddess Tārā.

In other sutras, she is regarded as a female counterpart to Avalokiteśvara, the bodhisattva of compassion. Like him, Sitātapatrā manifests in many elaborate forms: having a thousand faces, arms and legs, or simply as a feminine deity of great beauty. Known foremost for her "white parasol" she is most frequently attributed with the "golden wheel". The auspiciousness of the turning of the dharma wheel is symbolic of Buddhism, both in its teachings and realizations.

See also 
List of bodhisattvas

References

External links
  Buddhist Deity: Sitatapatra - at Himalayan Art Resources
     

Buddhist tantras
Buddhist mantras
Bodhisattvas
Yidams
Female buddhas and supernatural beings
Taras